The Hackney Kestrels were a  Speedway team which operated from 1984, when the Crayford Kestrels transferred the promotion to Hackney, until their closure in 1990.

History
During their first season in the 1984 National League season the team finished 4th and won the Knockout Cup (div 2).

In 1988, the Kestrels won the Division 2 League Championship, winning twenty-six of their thirty league matches. The Kestrels also won the division 2 Knockout Cup for the second time, beating the Wimbledon Dons on aggregate in the final.

Notable riders

Season summary

See also
Hackney Wick Wolves
Hackney Hawks
London Lions

References

Defunct British speedway teams
Sports clubs established in 1984
Sports clubs disestablished in 1990
Speedway teams in London
Hackney Wick
Hackney, London